A conjunctive waw or vav conjunctive  (Hebrew:  ו' החיבור  vav hakhivur) is the use of Hebrew vav (letter) as a conjunction to join two parts of speech. It is distinct from waw-consecutive which is a verb construction.

Conjunction of two nouns
Primarily two nouns may be joined by conjunctive vav without equation, for example Moshe v-Aron ("Moses and Aaron"). Conjunctive vav may however indicate hendiadys where two nouns are equated. An example is found in two examples from Leviticus 25 where the nouns ger "stranger," and toshav "sojourner," are joined by conjunctive waw and usually construed as a hendiadys. However, in Numbers 35:15, each noun is accompanied by the repeated prepositional prefix lo- "to," as in "to-the stranger and (vav) to-the sojourner," which indicates two distinct concepts.

Conjunction of two verbs
Waw-conjunctive may also be used or omitted between two verbs. In imperative sentences such as "sit and wait" the use of the waw between the two verbs is particularly common in maskilic literature, but there are no clear cut semantic considerations regulating the use of vav conjunctive.

References

Hebrew grammar